Daniel Macdonald (4 March 1846 – 18 April 1927) was a missionary to the New Hebrides (now Vanuatu). He was born in Alloa, Scotland, but migrated to Ballarat, Victoria. He studied at the Presbyterian Theological Hall in Melbourne, and was the first Australian-trained Presbyterian missionary to the New Hebrides.

Macdonald served at Port Havannah on the island of Efate from 1872 to 1905. He was the "most notable linguist in the history of the New Hebrides Mission", and was the "organising translator-editor" of the Nguna–Efate Old Testament published in 1908. He, John W. Mackenzie, and Peter Milne each contributed approximately one third of the translation. Macdonald espoused the idea that Oceanic languages were of Semitic origin, and promoted a hybrid Efatese language. He and Milne were involved in a feud that lasted for more than fifteen years, which started with a disagreement over how to translate the word "God" in the local language.

Macdonald was awarded a Doctor of Divinity degree from McGill University, and served as moderator of the Presbyterian Church of Victoria in 1896.

He married Elizabeth Keir Geddie, daughter of missionary Rev. John Geddie.

References

1846 births
1927 deaths
People from Alloa
Scottish emigrants to Australia
Scottish Presbyterian missionaries
Australian Presbyterian missionaries
Presbyterian missionaries in Vanuatu
Translators of the Bible into Oceanic languages
British expatriates in Vanuatu
Australian expatriates in Vanuatu
McGill University alumni
New Hebrides people
Missionary linguists